Mesoderm posterior 1 homolog (mouse) is a protein that in humans is encoded by the MESP1 gene. MESP1 is a transcription factor that regulates cardiovascular progenitor specification.

References

Further reading 

 
 
 
 

Genes on human chromosome 15